Mario Roberto Martínez Hernández (born 30 July 1989) is a Honduran footballer who plays as a midfielder for Marathón. Born in San Pedro Sula, Martínez played for the Honduras national football team from 2010 to 2018.

Club career

Martínez was spotted by Norwegian scouts during the tournament against Trinidad and Tobago and shortly after went on loan to Norwegian side, Vålerenga. He also travelled to Norway alongside U-20 teammate, Reinieri Mayorquín who went on loan to Aalesund. Martínez made his debut in Tippeligaen when Vålerenga lost 3–4 against Start on 3 May 2009, but were mostly playing for Vålerenga's reserve team in the Second Division. Martínez only got two appearances for Vålerenga, both coming on as a substitute. The same year, Martínez played for Honduras U-20 in the 2009 FIFA U-20 World Cup in Egypt, and was the team's best player in the 3–0 victory against Hungary U-20, where he scored two goals.

In January 2010, he joined the Belgian team RSC Anderlecht on a six-month loan-deal.

On 1 August 2012, Martínez joined MLS club Seattle Sounders FC on loan from Real España. His first training session in Seattle was 17 August 2012. He participated in a reserve league match with the Sounders on 19 August 2012 in a 3–2 win over the Los Angeles Galaxy reserves. His first goal for the Sounders won the Western Conference semi-final match against Real Salt Lake on 8 November 2012.
 
On 2014, Martinez was signed by Barcelona SC in Ecuador.

In 2017, Martinez returned to Honduran club, Real España.

International career
On 4 September 2010, Martínez made his debut for the Honduras National Team in a match against El Salvador, where Honduras won 4–3 via penalty shootout due to a 2–2 tie in regular time. He assisted the first goal for Honduras, thus helping his team to the Copa Independencia. He was part of Honduras's team at the 2012 Summer Olympics.

Honours

Real España
Honduran Liga Nacional (1): 2006–07

Anderlecht
Belgian Pro League (1): 2009–10

References

External links
 
 
 
 

1989 births
Living people
Association football midfielders
Honduran footballers
Honduras international footballers
Real C.D. España players
Vålerenga Fotball players
R.S.C. Anderlecht players
Seattle Sounders FC players
Barcelona S.C. footballers
Liga Nacional de Fútbol Profesional de Honduras players
Eliteserien players
ENPPI SC players
Major League Soccer players
People from San Pedro Sula
Honduran expatriate footballers
Expatriate footballers in Norway
Honduran expatriate sportspeople in Norway
Expatriate footballers in Belgium
Honduran expatriate sportspeople in Belgium
Expatriate soccer players in the United States
Honduran expatriate sportspeople in the United States
Expatriate footballers in Ecuador
Olympic footballers of Honduras
Expatriate footballers in Egypt
Footballers at the 2012 Summer Olympics
2011 Copa Centroamericana players
2013 Copa Centroamericana players
2013 CONCACAF Gold Cup players
2014 FIFA World Cup players
2014 Copa Centroamericana players
2015 CONCACAF Gold Cup players
Copa Centroamericana-winning players
Egyptian Premier League players
Honduras under-20 international footballers